Fehim Effendi Čurčić (1866 – 12 February 1916) was a Bosnian politician who served as the 5th Mayor of Sarajevo from 1910 to 1915. On 28 June 1914, Mayor Čurčić welcomed Archduke Franz Ferdinand of Austria and his wife Sophie, Duchess of Hohenberg to Sarajevo and was present later the same day at their assassination, the event that sparked World War I. He died aged 50 in an Austrian sanatorium.

Early life

Čurčić was born into a prominent family of ethnic Bosniaks who relocated to Sarajevo from Livno in the late 17th century. His father Ragib Čurčić (1824 – 4 July 1888) was a statesman in the Ottoman Empire, and the final mayor of Sarajevo under Ottoman rule from March 1875 until the Austrian occupation in August 1878. Fehim Čurčić had a brother named Muhamed, and two sisters. The family was Muslim.

Politics
Čurčić was working as a political aspirant in administrative country service. He attended course for officers and became a spare officer. Čurčić, who was repeatedly elected to Sarajevo's City Council, will go down in history as the last mayor of Sarajevo during the Austro-Hungarian rule over Bosnia and Herzegovina. Coincidentally, his father Ragib was the last mayor of Sarajevo in 1878 during Ottoman rule.

In the 14 November 1910 election for Mayor of Sarajevo, incumbent mayor Esad Kulović won a third term by an "overwhelming" majority, but refused post, thus the position was handed over to 44-year-old Fehim Čurčić. Coincidentally the last Bosnian census during Austro-Hungarian rule was conducted in the 1910 election year. Sarajevo at that time had 51,919 inhabitants. He took post on 29 December 1910. During his tenure, Čurčić opened the Chamber of Education in 1911. A year later the Kino Apolo (Apollo Cinema) was opened. Also, the city's main post office was constructed by Josip Vancaš, while the Museum of Sarajevo, as well as the Judicial Palace and the Faculty of Law building at the University of Sarajevo were constructed by Karel Pařík. Čurčić held post until 1915 when the City representation was dismissed.

Assassination of Archduke Franz Ferdinand
On 28 June 1914, Mayor Čurčić delivered a keynote address at City Hall (which is today the National and University Library of Bosnia and Herzegovina), where he welcomed the Austrian Archduke Franz Ferdinand to Sarajevo with Governor Oskar Potiorek. The first attempt on the life of the archduke failed. Čurčić rode in the first car with the Sarajevo Chief of Police Edmund Gerde and was unaware of what had transpired at the bridge. The noise of the motorcade had drowned out the bomb. Gavrilo Princip managed to assassinate Ferdinand and his wife in the second attempt, an event that sparked the First World War.

References

1866 births
1916 deaths
Bosniaks of Bosnia and Herzegovina
Mayors of Sarajevo